Kaheawa Wind Power is one of the largest wind farms in Hawaii. It is located on the island of Maui above the town of Maalaea in the West Maui Mountains.  Phase one (KWP I) of the project was completed in 2006 by developer and operator First Wind and produces 30 MW from 20 GE Energy 1.5 MW wind turbines.

Phase two (KWP II), completed in July 2012, built 14 turbines below phase one with an additional 21 MW for a total capacity of 51 MW serving 18,700 homes.
Kaheawa is the first wind farm in the United States to use a Habitat Conservation Plan (HCP) to protect the long term health of local species, including three endemic birds and one endemic bat.

Geography
Kaheawa Wind Power is located between the 2000–3000 foot elevation in Kaheawa Pastures in the Lahaina District, on the slopes of the Ukumehame land division (ahupuaa) of the West Maui Mountains.  The site is bounded by Papalaua Gulch in the west and Manawainui Gulch in the east.

Phase two of the project is located on the Kaheawa Ridge at the 1800–2700 foot elevation, just southeast of KWP I.

Background
The first wind project was proposed in 1996.  Zond Pacific installed a series of six anemometers in the area to collect and study wind data.  The project was developed by several companies before UPC Wind Partners, LLC and Makani Nui Associates, LLC formed a partnership.  An environmental impact statement (EIS) was approved in 1999, followed by a Conservation District Use Application in 2003.

Development

In September 2006, Kaheawa Wind Power began negotiating with the state Department of Land and Natural Resources to expand the wind farm.  In February 2011, MECO finalized a power purchasing agreement to buy power from an additional 14 turbines under construction for phase two of the wind farm, which planned to add a new 10 MW battery energy storage system (BESS).  The 14 new turbines and battery storage system went online on July 2, 2012.

Specifications

Habitat

The environmental impact statement for Kaheawa led to the development of a habitat conservation plan (HCP), the first HCP ever used for a wind farm of this scale in the United States.  The plan helps fund conservation efforts for four protected species, including three endemic birds and one endemic bat: the Hawaiian goose (nene), the Hawaiian petrel (uau), the Hawaiian shearwater (ao), and the Hawaiian hoary bat (opeapea).  The project is also researching how to best protect the nesting areas of seabirds.

The initial construction of the wind farm required restoration efforts for several plant species in the area.  More than 24,000 native plants were eventually restored, comprising species such as Dodonaea viscosa (aalii), Metrosideros polymorpha (Ōhia lehua), Bidens micrantha (kookoolau), Wikstroemia oahuensis (akia), and Heteropogon contortus (pili).

The habitat also includes  Sida fallax (ilima), Sophora chrysophylla (māmane), Lycopodiella cernua (wāwaeiole), and two invasive species, Leucaena leucocephala (koa haole) and  Cenchrus ciliaris.

In September 2015, SunEdison discovered that the turbines were killing more hoary bats than had been predicted in the initial ecological review. They petitioned the Endangered Species Recovery Committee for permission to increase the number of bats that can die in the lifespan of the turbines from 14 to 80.

See also

Auwahi Wind
Wind power in the United States

Notes

References

Hao, Sean. (September 12, 2006). Wind farm capacity to double. Honolulu Advertiser. 
Hawaiian Electric Company. (February 15, 2011). Newly approved contract clears path for largest wind energy project in Hawaii. Hawaii's Energy Future.
Hollier, Dennis. (April 2010). Building a Smart Grid. Hawaii Business. 55 (10), 36-43. 
Imada, Lee. (July 6, 2012). Wind project, battery online; 'milestone' in energy goals. The Maui News.
Kaheawa Wind Power. (2006). Makani Nui Associates, LLC.,  Kahului, Hawaii.
Kaheawa Wind Power II, LLC. (April 2010). Kaheawa Wind Power II Wind Energy Generation Facility. Habitat Conservation Plan. Ukumehame, Maui, Hawaii. 
Leone, Diana. (September 20, 2006). New Maui wind farm seeks to double in size. Honolulu Star-Bulletin.
MECO gets ok to buy power from Kaheawa II wind farm. (February 11, 2011). Honolulu Star-Advertiser. 
Planning Solutions. (December 2007). Environmental Impact Statement Preparation Notice.  Kaheawa Wind Power II Wind Energy Generation Facility. Ukumehame, Maui, Hawaii.
Shimogawa, Duane. (November 18, 2011). Maui sees a clean-energy surplus. Pacific Business News.
Ubay, Jason. (July 2008). Maui's Bumpy Road to Renewable Energy. Hawaii Business. 54 (1), 28-34. 
Wilson, Christie. (July 18, 2006). Maui wind farm goes online. Honolulu Advertiser, A1.
Wireless News. (June 28, 2011) First Wind Promos 5-Year Anniversary of Commercial Operations for Kaheawa Wind Power.  Close-Up Media, Inc.
WSB-Hawaii. (1999). Final: Kaheawa Pastures 20 MW windfarm, Maui, Hawaii: Environmental Impact Statement. Kaneohe, HI: The Firm.

Further reading
Kaheawa selected for U.S. wind technology research. (April 1, 2008). The Maui News.

External links

Official site

Wind farms in Hawaii
Energy infrastructure completed in 2012
2012 establishments in Hawaii